Harry Washington Mountford (born 1886; date of death unknown) was an English footballer who played as a forward for Burslem Port Vale, Everton, Burnley, and Third Lanark. He scored 43 goals in 150 league appearances in a ten-year career in the English Football League.

Career

Burslem Port Vale
Mountford began his career with Hanley Swifts, before joining Burslem Port Vale as an amateur in June 1903. He scored his first goal in the Second Division on 23 January 1904, in a 4–1 defeat at Glossop. He played a total of seven games in 1903–04, scoring two goals. He hit three goals in 28 appearances in 1904–05. He scored a hat-trick past Lincoln City in a 3–1 win at the Athletic Ground on 30 December 1905, and finished the 1905–06 season as the club's top-scorer with 15 goals in 37 appearances. He scored 11 goals in 37 games in 1906–07, before being transferred to Everton in June 1907, when Vale suffered a financial crisis and resigned from the English Football League. In his four seasons at Port Vale, Mountford made 109 appearances in league and cup competitions, and scored a total of 31 goals.

Later career
The "Toffees" finished 11th in the First Division in 1907–08, before finishing in second place in 1908–09, tenth in 1909–10, and then fourth in 1910–11. Mountford scored five goals in 25 league games in his four years at Goodison Park. He then followed Bert Freeman and moved on to Burnley, helping the "Clarets" to finish third in the Second Division in 1911–12, before they won promotion with a second-place finish in 1912–13. Mountford scored ten goals in 29 league games in his two seasons at Turf Moor. He then moved to Scotland to play for Third Lanark where he was a fairly regular starter for two seasons and featured in a Scottish Cup semi-final in the first (Thirds lost out to eventual winners Celtic).

Career statistics
Source:

Honours
Burnley
Football League Second Division second-place promotion: 1912–13

References

Sportspeople from Hanley, Staffordshire
English footballers
Association football forwards
Port Vale F.C. players
Everton F.C. players
Burnley F.C. players
Third Lanark A.C. players
English Football League players
Scottish Football League players
1886 births
Year of death missing